The VII Army Corps / VII AK was a corps level command of the Prussian and then the Imperial German Armies from the 19th Century to World War I.

Originating in 1815 as the General Command for the Province of Westphalia, the headquarters was in Münster and its catchment area was the Province of Westphalia and the Principalities of Lippe and Schaumburg-Lippe.

The Corps served in the Austro-Prussian War. During the Franco-Prussian War it was assigned to the 1st Army.

In peacetime the Corps was assigned to the III Army Inspectorate which became the 2nd Army at the start of the First World War. It was still in existence at the end of the war in the 7th Army, Heeresgruppe Deutscher Kronprinz on the Western Front.  The Corps was disbanded with the demobilisation of the German Army after World War I.

Austro-Prussian War 
VII Corps fought in the Austro-Prussian War in 1866, seeing action in the Battle of Königgrätz.

Franco-Prussian War 
During the Franco-Prussian War, the Corps formed part of the 1st Army and fought in several battles and engagements, including the Battle of Spicheren, the Battle of Borny-Colombey, the Battle of Gravelotte and the Siege of Metz.

Peacetime organisation 
The 25 peacetime Corps of the German Army (Guards, I - XXI, I - III Bavarian) had a reasonably standardised organisation. Each consisted of two divisions with usually two infantry brigades, one field artillery brigade and a cavalry brigade each.  Each brigade normally consisted of two regiments of the appropriate type, so each Corps normally commanded 8 infantry, 4 field artillery and 4 cavalry regiments. There were exceptions to this rule:
V, VI, VII, IX and XIV Corps each had a 5th infantry brigade (so 10 infantry regiments)
II, XIII, XVIII and XXI Corps had a 9th infantry regiment
I, VI and XVI Corps had a 3rd cavalry brigade (so 6 cavalry regiments)
the Guards Corps had 11 infantry regiments (in 5 brigades) and 8 cavalry regiments (in 4 brigades).
Each Corps also directly controlled a number of other units. This could include one or more
Foot Artillery Regiment
Jäger Battalion
Pioneer Battalion
Train Battalion

World War I

Organisation on mobilisation 
On mobilization on 2 August 1914 the Corps was restructured. 13th and 14th Cavalry Brigades were withdrawn to form part of the 9th Cavalry Division. The 16th Uhlans, formerly of the IV Corps, was raised to a strength of 6 squadrons before being split into two half-regiments of 3 squadrons each. The half-regiments were assigned as divisional cavalry to 13th and 14th Divisions. 28th Infantry Brigade was assigned to the 14th Reserve Division with the VII Reserve Corps. Divisions received engineer companies and other support units from the Corps headquarters. In summary, VII Corps mobilised with 25 infantry battalions, 9 machine gun companies (54 machine guns), 6 cavalry squadrons, 24 field artillery batteries (144 guns), 4 heavy artillery batteries (16 guns), 3 pioneer companies and an aviation detachment.

Combat chronicle 
On mobilisation, VII Corps was assigned to the 2nd Army forming part of the right wing of the forces for the Schlieffen Plan offensive in August 1914 on the Western Front.

It participated in the First Battle of the Marne and First Battle of Ypres in 1914.

It was still in existence at the end of the war in the 7th Army, Heeresgruppe Deutscher Kronprinz on the Western Front.

Commanders 
The VII Corps had the following commanders during its existence:

See also 

Franco-Prussian War order of battle
German Army order of battle (1914)
German Army order of battle, Western Front (1918)
List of Imperial German infantry regiments
List of Imperial German artillery regiments
List of Imperial German cavalry regiments
Order of battle of the First Battle of the Marne
Order of First Battle of Ypres

References

Bibliography 
 
 
 
 
 

Corps of Germany in World War I
Military units and formations established in 1815
Military units and formations disestablished in 1919